Green River station is a train station in Green River, Utah. It is served by Amtrak's  California Zephyr, which runs once daily between Chicago and Emeryville, California, in the San Francisco Bay Area. The station has a platform and bus-stop style shelter and no services.

History

The station was originally built by the Denver and Rio Grande Railroad in the mid-twentieth century and called the "Blake Station". It is now owned by the Union Pacific Railroad.

Amtrak took over most intercity passenger service on May 1, 1971. However, the Denver and Rio Grande Western Railroad (D&RGW) opted to continue to privately operate its Rio Grande Zephyr. In 1983, facing heavy losses, the D&RGW agreed to allow Amtrak to reroute the San Francisco Zephyr over its Moffat Tunnel Route mainline. A mudslide severed the line on April 14, 1983, ending Rio Grande Zephyr service west of Grand Junction, Colorado. After the line was rebuilt, Amtrak's newly renamed California Zephyr began operating over the D&RGW on July 16, 1983, with stops at both Thompson Springs and Green River. The Green River stop was eliminated along with lightly used stops at Bond and Rifle in Colorado on October 30, 1983.

On May 11, 1997, Amtrak closed Thompson station and reopened Green River with a handicapped-accessible platform. The Desert Wind and Pioneer sections of the California Zephyr were eliminated the same day. The Thompson station building was later removed.

References

External links 

 Green River Amtrak Station (USA RailGuide -- TrainWeb)

Amtrak stations in Utah
Stations along Denver and Rio Grande Western Railroad lines
Transportation in Emery County, Utah
Buildings and structures in Emery County, Utah